Oncideres diana is a species of beetle in the family Cerambycidae. It was described by Olivier in 1792. It is known from Brazil and French Guiana.

References

diana
Beetles described in 1792